Comoé District is one of fourteen administrative districts of Ivory Coast. The district is located in the southeast corner of the country, bordering Ghana to the east, Zanzan District to the north, Lacs District and Lagunes District to the west, and the Atlantic Ocean to the south. The capital of the district is Abengourou.

Creation
Comoé District was created in a 2011 administrative reorganisation of the subdivisions of Ivory Coast. The territory of the district was composed by merging the former regions of Moyen-Comoé and Sud-Comoé.

Administrative divisions
Comoé District is currently subdivided into two regions and the following departments:
 Indénié-Djuablin Region (formerly Moyen-Comoé Region) (region seat also in Abengourou)
 Abengourou Department
 Agnibilékrou Department
 Bettié Department
 Sud-Comoé Region (region seat in Aboisso)
 Aboisso Department
 Adiaké Department
 Grand-Bassam Department
 Tiapoum Department

Population
According to the 2021 census, Comoé District has a population of 1,501,366.

References

 
Districts of Ivory Coast
States and territories established in 2011